The bombing of Belgrade may refer to:

 
 Bombardment of Belgrade (1914)
 Bombing of Belgrade in World War II
 Bombing of Belgrade (1941)
 Bombing of Belgrade (1944)
 Bombing of Belgrade during the 1999 NATO bombing of Yugoslavia, part of the Kosovo War